Spatulosia malgassica is a moth in the subfamily Arctiinae. It was described by Hervé de Toulgoët in 1965. It is found on Madagascar.

References

Moths described in 1965
Lithosiini